Le spie uccidono a Beirut (literally, The Spies kill in Beirut, also titled Da 077 : le spie uccidono a Beirut, i.e. Message from 077 : the spies kill in Beirut) is a 1965 Italian/French international co-production spy film pertaining to the Eurospy genre.

In this film inspired by the James Bond film series, Richard Harrison stars as Secret Agent Fleming known as Bart Fleming Agent X-117 in some prints and as Bob Fleming Agent 077 in others. The film was directed by film producer Luciano Martino, in one of his few forays into directing. It was released in the United States by American International Pictures as Secret Agent Fireball (to exploit the then current 007 film, Thunderball)  and double billed with Spy in Your Eye.  The film was shot in Paris, Hamburg and Beirut.

Harrison repeated his Agent Fleming role in A 077, sfida ai killers/Killers are Challenged/Mission Casablanca.

Plot
When a series of scientists are killed, Bart Fleming Secret Agent X-177 travels to Hamburg and Beirut to discover that Soviet Agents are killing the scientists.  Both sides want the information the scientists took with them when they escaped from the USSR; a roll of microfilm containing information about the Soviet H-Bomb.  The only link left to the film is a daughter of one of the scientists.

Cast
Richard Harrison	... 	Agent Fleming 
Dominique Boschero	... 	Liz
Luciano Pigozzi	... 	Yuri (as Alan Collins)
Aldo Cecconi	... 	Ivan (as Jim Clay)
Wandisa Guida	... 	Elena
Alcide Borik	... 	Lepetit the Taxi Driver
Danny Taborra 	... 	Adolf Grune 
Goffredo Unger      ... 	Baalbek the Tribal Leader
Carla Calò 	... 	Jane Cartland 
Jean Ozenne  	...     Fleming's Boss 
Audry Fisher       ...      Heidi

References

External links
 

1965 films
1960s Italian-language films
Italian spy thriller films
1960s action thriller films
1960s spy thriller films
American International Pictures films
Films set in Lebanon
Films scored by Carlo Savina
Parody films based on James Bond films
1960s Italian films